The following list includes notable dance-rock artists.

Artists

!!!
ABC
And Then There Were None
The B-52's
Big Audio Dynamite
The Big Pink
BodyRockers
A Certain Ratio
The Charlatans
Depeche Mode
Devo
Duran Duran
Electronic
EMF
Eurythmics
The Farm
Fine Young Cannibals
Frankie Goes to Hollywood
Franz Ferdinand
Friendly Fires
Gang of Four
Garbage
Hall & Oates
Happy Mondays
Hot Chelle Rae
Hot Chip
Billy Idol
INXS
Mick Jagger
Jesus Jones
The Killers
LCD Soundsystem
Liquid Liquid
The New Cities
New Order
No Doubt
Oingo Boingo
Robert Palmer
Pet Shop Boys
Primal Scream
The Prodigy
Pseudo Echo
Public Image Ltd
Rogue Traders
Scissor Sisters
The Shamen
Simple Minds
The Stone Roses
Talking Heads
Tom Tom Club
U2
Walk the Moon
Was (Not Was)
The White Tie Affair
Robbie Williams

References

 
Dance-rock
Dance-rock